Myanmar participated in the 2002 Asian Games held in Busan, South Korea, from 29 September to 14 October  2002. Athletes from Myanmar won overall twelve medals (including one gold), and clinched 23rd spot in the medal table.

References

Nations at the 2002 Asian Games
2002
Asian Games